Edward Marshall Kimball (June 26, 1859 – January 4, 1938) was an American actor of the silent era. He appeared in more than 60 films between 1912 and 1936. Like many older actors of the Victorian and Edwardian eras, he enjoyed a varied stage career on and off Broadway before entering the silent films.

Kimball was born in Keokuk, Iowa and died in Hollywood, California. He was the father of actress Clara Kimball Young in whose films he sometimes appeared.

Partial filmography

 Martha's Rebellion (1912, Short) - Dr. Goodwill
 The Awakening of Jones (1912, Short) - (as Edward M. Kimball)
 A Vitagraph Romance (1912, Short) - Senator Carter of Montana
 The Delayed Letter (1913) - Mabel's Father
 The Little Minister (1913, Short) - Elder of the Church (as Edward M. Kimball)
 The Only Way (1913, Short)
 The Cure (1913, Short) - Dr. Phillips
 The Christian (1914) - Lord Storm
 Memories That Haunt (1914, Short) - Isobel's Father (as Edward M. Kimball)
 The Spirit and the Clay (1914, Short) - Galton
 The Awakening of Barbara Dare (1914, Short)
 The Crime of Cain (1914, Short) - Judge Stone
 The Gang (1914, Short) (AKA The Reformation of the Gang (USA))
 The House on the Hill (1914, Short) - Jeptha Newcomb
 Lily of the Valley (1914, Short) - Old Kemble - Lily's Father (as Edward M. Kimball)
 Lola (1914) (AKA Without A Soul (USA:  Reissue Title)) - Dr. Crossett (Edward M. Kimball)
 The Deep Purple (1915) - Reverend William Moore
 The Little Miss Brown (1915) - Justin Glenton (Edward M. Kimball)
 Marrying Money (1915) (AKA Marriage a la Carte (USA:  Reissue Title)) - Lyman Niles
 The Impostor (1915) (AKA The Impostors (copyright title)) - Mr. Priestley
 The Little Mademoiselle (1915) - Mr. Pemberton
 Camille (1915) - The Doctor (as Edward M. Kimball)
 The Yellow Passport (1916) (AKA The Badge of Shame (USA:  Reissue Title)) - David Sokoloff
 Love's Crucible (1916, Short) - Mr. Dymsley (as Ed M. Kimball)
 A Woman's Power (1916) - MacAllister Falkins (as E.M. Kimball)
 The Feast of Life (1916) - Father Venture
 Tangled Fates (1916) (AKA The Grubstaker) - Mr. Lawson
 Miss Petticoats (1916) - Captain Joel Stewart (as Edward M. Kimball)
 A Woman's Way (1916) - John Livingston (as Ed M. Kimball)
 The Common Law (1916) - Mr. Neville (as Edward M. Kimball)
 The Hidden Scar (1916) (AKA The Scorching Way) - Reverend James Overton
 A Woman Alone (1917) (AKA Lonliness) - Rufus Waldron
 The Bondage of Fear (1917) - Dr. Jason Wheatley (as Edward M. Kimball)
 The Web of Desire (1917) - Thomas Hurd (as Edward M. Kimball)
 Man's Woman (1917) - Jimmy Regan
 The Mad Lover (1917) (AKA A Modern Othello (USA), The Lash of Jealousy (USA), The Shadow of the Night (USA)) - the Pastor
 Magda (1917) - (as Edward M. Kimball)
 The Marionettes (1918) - Professor De Ferney (as Edward M. Kimball)
 The House of Glass (1918) - Lawyer McClellan
 The Accidental Honeymoon (1918) - Roland Edwards
The Claw (1918) - the Postmaster (as E.M. Kimball)
The Savage Woman (1918) - Jacques Benoit (as Edward M. Kimball)
 The Road Through the Dark (1918) - Father Alphonse (Edward M. Kimball)
 A Son of Strife (1918) - Count Andre Vaskova
 The Better Wife (1919) - Mr. Page
 Eyes of Youth (1919)
 For the Soul of Rafael (1920) - Ricardo (as Edward M. Kimball)
 Mid-Channel (1920) - Honorable Peter Mottram (as Edward M. Kimball)
 Roman Candles (1920) (aka Yankee Doodle Jr.) - John Arnold Sr. (as Edward M. Kimball)
 Silk Husbands and Calico Wives (1920) - Jerome Appleby
 Boys Will Be Boys (1921) - Judge Priest
 An Unwilling Hero (1921) - Lovejoy
 Charge It (1921) - Tom Garreth (as Edward M. Kimball)
 What No Man Knows (1921) - Dr. Ralph Cummings
 The Masquerader (1922) - Brock (as Edward M. Kimball)
 Omar the Tentmaker (1922) - Omar's Father (as Edward M. Kimball)
 The Woman of Bronze (1923) - Papa Bonelli
 The Remittance Woman (1923) - Anthony Campbell
 Trilby (1923) - Impresario
 The Cheat (1923) - Judge
 Passion's Pathway (1924) - John Deering
 I'll Show You the Town (1925) - Professor Carlyle McCabe
 Modern Times (1936) - Doctor (uncredited)

References

External links

 
 
 

1859 births
1938 deaths
American male film actors
American male silent film actors
Male actors from Iowa
People from Keokuk, Iowa
20th-century American male actors